Department of Arch(a)eology or Arch(a)eology Department may refer to:

Government departments
 AJK Tourism and Archeology Department, Azad Jammu and Kashmir, Pakistan
 Department of Archaeology (Bangladesh)
 Department of Archaeology (Nepal) 
 Department of Archaeology (Sri Lanka) 
 Karnataka State Department of Archaeology, India
 Kerala State Archaeology Department, India
 Tamil Nadu Archaeology Department, India
 Washington State Department of Archaeology and Historic Preservation, United States

Academic departments
 University of Liverpool Department of Archaeology, Classics and Egyptology, England
 Department of Archaeology at the University of York, England